Oliver Milburn (17 September 1883 – 14 December 1932) was a Canadian painter. His work was part of the painting event in the art competition at the 1932 Summer Olympics.

References

1883 births
1932 deaths
20th-century Canadian painters
Artists from Toronto
Canadian male painters
Olympic competitors in art competitions
People from Old Toronto
20th-century Canadian male artists